The Great Southern of Spain Railway was a Spanish-British railway company that operated in southern Spain between the late 19th and mid-20th centuries. It was the owner of several railway lines, such as the Lorca-Baza and the Almendricos-Águilas, developing an important activity in the transport of minerals.

References

External links 

 https://www.faydon.com/Web%20Page%20GSSR.htm

Railway lines